Mohamed Taki Abdoulkarim ( 20 February 1936 – 6 November 1998) was President of the Comoros from 25 March 1996 until his death on 6 November 1998.

Life
He was born in Mbeni, Grande Comore and issued family privileges, he was the beneficiary of Djumbé Fumu, descendant of Sultan Msa Fumu.  He studied in Madagascar as a child then went to France to continue his education and obtain an engineering degree in public works.  Returning to Grande Comore, Said Mohamed Cheikh made him responsible for the public works in Anjouan where he made the acquaintance of Ahmed Abdallah.

Career positions
1970 : Minister of Development under the second government of Said Ibrahim Ben Ali
1971 : Minister of Education
1972 : Minister of Rural Development under the government of Saïd Mohamed Jaffar
1973 : Minister of Special Planning under Ahmed Abdallah
1975 : Minister of the Interior

He took refuge in Mbeni under the regime of Ali Soilih, resisting with civil disobedience and jailed.  He was freed from captivity by mercenaries.

1978 : Secretary of the Directory Counsel presided by Ahmed Abdallah
1978–1984 : President of the Federal Assembly

He broke ties with Abdallah and took refuge in France.

Later political career
In 1990, Taki returned to the country and became a candidate for president after the death of Abdallah. However, Said Mohamed Djohar won the elections. He served as Prime Minister from 7 January 1992 to 15 July 1992 and was acting President from 2 October 1995 to 5 October 1995. He was elected President of the Comoros from 25 March 1996 until his death on 6 November 1998.

References 

1936 births
1998 deaths
Presidents of the Comoros
Speakers of the Assembly of the Union of the Comoros
People from Grande Comore
Government ministers of the Comoros